, better known by his alias Megwin, is a Japanese YouTuber and comedian. Megwin is one of YouTube Japan's most prolific YouTube bloggers, having 969,962 subscribers as of 14 June 2019. Sekine started out doing live comedy before switching to YouTube in 2005, where he has been releasing a video every day for 10 years with his various friends and workers. In 2011 he registered his own company . He has also partnered with the company Tanita and has held lectures on the new "Digital Hollywood". In 2013, Sekine released his first book .
His channel previously consisted of four core members: Bandy, Falcon, Meteo and Megwin.

A video published to YouTube on October 14, 2018 announced that Bandy would be leaving Megwin TV. He has since started his own YouTube channel with his wife. Falcon and Meteo have also stopped appearing on Megwin TV, though there was no formal announcement of their departure. They stopped appearing in videos around December 2018. They have also started their own channel together.

References

External links

1977 births
Comedy-related YouTube channels
Japanese Internet celebrities
People from Yokosuka, Kanagawa
Japanese comedians
Living people
Comedy YouTubers
Japanese YouTubers